Mark Boone Junior (born Mark Heidrich; March 17, 1955) is an American character actor, best known for his TV roles as Bobby Munson in Sons of Anarchy (2008–14) and Patrick "Pat" Brown in Last Man On Earth, and film roles in Christopher Nolan's Memento (2000) and Batman Begins (2005), Die Hard 2 (1990), and 2 Fast 2 Furious (2003).

Early life and education
Boone was born Mark Heidrich in Cincinnati, Ohio, to Ginny, a retired teacher, and Bob Heidrich, a former construction consultant. He grew up on Chicago's North Shore and attended the University of Vermont and played on the school's men's soccer team. He moved to New York after college, where he started his career performing stand-up comedy with long-time friend Steve Buscemi. His stage name surname, Boone, is also his nickname; he chose it from a New York City war memorial.

Career
Boone frequently portrays a corrupt policeman or other authority figure, such as in Seven (as an FBI agent) and as corrupt Detective Flass in Batman Begins. He has performed in over 70 movies, including 2 Fast 2 Furious, Get Carter, The General's Daughter, The Thin Red Line, and Die Hard 2. He has made guest appearances on TV in Law & Order, Seinfeld, Curb Your Enthusiasm, and several other shows. He played a small role in Armageddon and in an episode of the HBO prison drama series Oz. In 1984 he acted in The Way It Is (1985) by Eric Mitchell, which included actors Steve Buscemi and Rockets Redglare. He has appeared in some of Buscemi's directorial work, including Trees Lounge and as "Evil" in Lonesome Jim. (Buscemi was also in Armageddon.) In 1987, Boone co-starred with Richard Edson in Not a Door: A Spectacle, Scott B and Joseph Nechvatal's collaborative art performance at Hallwalls based on the poetry of St. John of the Cross, Flaubert's Temptation of St. Anthony and works of Jean Genet and Georges Bataille. He played Dr. Eduard Gillespie in the 2023 film Atrabilious.

Boone was a regular cast member on the TV drama series Sons of Anarchy, playing Bobby "Elvis" Munson. In an episode of the TV series Quantum Leap, he played a biker named Maddog, similar to his character many years later in Sons of Anarchy. In 2011, he played the role of Vincent Dooly's father in The Mother of Invention.

He has appeared in two Christopher Nolan films: Memento, as Burt, the front desk manager at the Discount Inn, and Batman Begins, as Detective Flass, James Gordon's crooked partner.

Filmography

Film and television

Video games

References

External links

1955 births
Male actors from Cincinnati
American male film actors
American male television actors
20th-century American male actors
21st-century American male actors
Living people
Male actors from Chicago
New Trier High School alumni
University of Vermont alumni
Vermont Catamounts men's soccer players
Association footballers not categorized by position
Association football players not categorized by nationality